Krishna Subramanian is a serial tech entrepreneur, angel investor and commentator on mobile advertising. He is best known for a being a founding employee of BlueLithium, one of the largest online ad network acquired by Yahoo in 2007 for $300 million, and Mobclix, a mobile ad exchange network acquired by Velti in 2010. Subramanian has also written for Forbes, The Huffington Post, Advertising Age and Mashable.

Career

Burrp! 
In 2003, Subramanian co-founded Burrp!, an internet recommendation and review portal for local businesses and landmarks that operated in a number of Indian cities. Burrp! was acquired by Network 18 in 2009.

BlueLithium 
In January 2004, he became a founding employee of BlueLithium. BlueLithium was an online advertising network, which provided a platform that displayed highly targeted advertising impressions. BlueLithium was acquired by Yahoo! in 2007 for $300 million. At the time of its acquisition, BlueLithium was the fifth largest ad network in the US and the second largest in the UK.

Mobclix 
In 2008, Subramanian co-founded Mobclix with Sunil Verma and Vishal Gurbuxani. Mobclix was a mobile ad exchange network, which was acquired by Velti in 2010. Subramanian became chief marketing officer of Velti in 2011.

Subramanian resigned from Velti in October 2013. He was reelected to Mobile Marketing Association’s board of directors the same month.

Captiv8 
In Jan 2015, Subramanian co-founded Captiv8 with Vishal Gurbuxani, Taz Patel, and Sunil Verma.

References

External links
 

Businesspeople from California
Living people
University of California, Davis alumni
Year of birth missing (living people)